Beatrice Winde (born Beatrice Lucille Williams; January 5, 1924 – January 3, 2004) was an American actress. Her work as a character actor, and a singer, in theatrical, television, and film roles, spanned several decades.

Life and career
Winde was born in Chicago, Illinois. She graduated from the Chicago Music Conservatory as a voice student and continued her voice studies briefly at the Yale University School of Music and at Juilliard.

Winde appeared on Broadway in the 1971 Melvin Van Peebles musical Ain't Supposed to Die a Natural Death, which won her the Theatre World Award and a Tony Award nomination. Winde's screen appearances include Oliver's Story and Jefferson in Paris and television credits include The Sopranos and Law & Order.

Awards
 Audelco Award for Best Supporting Actress (A Lesson Before Dying, staged by the Signature Theater Company - 2001
 Living Legend Award from the National Black Theater - 1997
 Joseph Jefferson Award for Actress in a Cameo Role (The Young Man from Atlanta, Goodman Theatre, Chicago) - 1997

Filmography

Film

 The Autobiography of Miss Jane Pittman (1974) - Lena
 The Taking of Pelham One Two Three (1974) - Mrs. Jenkins
 The Gambler (1974) - Hospital Receptionist
 Mandingo (1975) - Lucy
 Sparkle (1976) - Mrs. Waters
 Oliver's Story (1978) - Waltereen
 Rich Kids (1979) - Corine 
 Hide in Plain Sight (1980) - Unemployment Clerk
 From the Hip (1987) - 2nd Judge
 Stars and Bars (1988) - Alma-May
 The Ambulance (1990) - Head Nurse
 A Rage in Harlem (1991) - Clerk
 The Super (1991) - Leotha
 Malcolm X (1992) - Elderly Woman
 The Last Good Time (1994) - Nurse Westman
 It Could Happen to You (1994) - Judge
 Jefferson in Paris (1995) - Mary Hemings
 Dangerous Minds (1995) - Mary Benton
 Lone Star (1996) - Minnie Bledsoe
 She's the One (1996) - Older Woman
 Clover (1997) - Aunt Katie
 The Real Blonde (1997) - Wilma
 Simon Birch (1998) - Hilde Grove
 Mickey Blue Eyes (1999) - Mrs. Horton, Michael's Neighbor
 The Hurricane (1999) - Louise Cockersham

Television
 American Playhouse; 1 episode (1982) - Tee
 Spenser: For Hire; 1 episode (1987) - Delia Johnson
 A Man Called Hawk; 1 episode (1989) - Mother Superior
 Law & Order; 4 episodes (1991-2001) - Jackson's grandmother / Corina Roberts / Sarah De Witt / Miss Perry (final appearance)
 The Cosby Show; 1 episode (1992)
 NYPD Blue; 1 episode (1995) - Gladys Denton
 The Sopranos; 1 episode (2000) - Funeral Guest

References

External links

1924 births
2004 deaths
20th-century African-American women singers
Actresses from Chicago
African-American actresses
American film actresses
American stage actresses
American television actresses
Deaths from cancer in New York (state)
Juilliard School alumni
Yale School of Music alumni
20th-century American actresses
21st-century American women